Thiago Farias Monte Monteiro (born June 15, 1981 in Fortaleza, Ceará), is a Brazilian table tennis player. He has won several medals in single, double, and team events in the Pan American Games and currently plays for Angers Vaillante in France. He is referred to as the next Hugo Hoyama and is currently ranked #1 player in Brazil and #21 in France.

Thiago participated in the 2004 Summer Olympics in Athens, Greece but was eliminated by Li Ching (Hong Kong) losing 4 - 1. He also competed in the 2008 Summer Olympics playing for the Brazilian team and singles.  He played in the team event at the 2012 Summer Olympics.

Along with Gustavo Tsuboi and Hugo Hoyama, Monteiro was part of the winning team at the 2007 Pan American Games and 2011 Pan American Games. Along with Hoyama, Monteiro has also received the bronze medal in 2007.

Early career 
Thiago was influenced by his father, a table tennis coach. Until the age of 12 Monteiro divided his attention between table tennis and futsal, where he also won two state championships. After winning his first Brazilian table tennis title in 1993, he decided to dedicate himself exclusively to table tennis. This title allowed him to compete for the South American Championships in 1995 where he won gold in the singles bringing him to the attention of the Brazilian National Team, which he joined in 1998.

References

External links 
 Thiago Monteiro official website

1981 births
Table tennis players at the 2007 Pan American Games
Table tennis players at the 2011 Pan American Games
Living people
Brazilian male table tennis players
Olympic table tennis players of Brazil
Table tennis players at the 2004 Summer Olympics
Table tennis players at the 2008 Summer Olympics
Table tennis players at the 2012 Summer Olympics
Table tennis players at the 2015 Pan American Games
Pan American Games gold medalists for Brazil
Pan American Games silver medalists for Brazil
Pan American Games bronze medalists for Brazil
Pan American Games medalists in table tennis
South American Games gold medalists for Brazil
South American Games silver medalists for Brazil
South American Games medalists in table tennis
Competitors at the 2006 South American Games
Medalists at the 2007 Pan American Games
Medalists at the 2011 Pan American Games
Medalists at the 2015 Pan American Games
Sportspeople from Fortaleza
20th-century Brazilian people
21st-century Brazilian people